The R699 road is a regional road in County Kilkenny, Ireland. It connects the N76 with the R448, via the M9. The road travels through the town of Callan and the villages of Dunnamaggin and Knocktopher.

References

Regional roads in the Republic of Ireland
Roads in County Kilkenny